Sarah Thornhill (2011) is a novel by Australian author Kate Grenville. It is the sequel to the author's 2005 novel The Secret River. It won the 2012  Australian Book Industry Awards (ABIA) — Australian General Fiction Book of the Year, and was shortlisted for the 2012 Prime Minister's Literary Awards.

Plot summary

Sarah Thornhill is the last child born to William and Sal Thornhill, whose struggle to establish a new life in Australia was told in the author's novel The Secret River. Sarah's mother is now dead and her father has re-married, who attempts to conceal and overcome her husband's convict past. But Sarah has a will of her own and falls in love with Jack Langland, a "half darkie", the product of a white father and an Aboriginal mother.

Notes

 Dedication: This novel is dedicated to the memory of Sophia Wiseman and Maryanne Wiseman, and their mother, 'Rugig'.
 Epigraph: "It does not follow that because a mountain appears to take on different shapes from different angles of vision, it has objectively no shape at all or an infinity of shapes." E. H. Carr.

Reviews

Belinda McKeon in The Guardian noted: "It is with often marvellous vividness and clarity that Grenville evokes Sarah's world, from childhood on the Hawkesbury, through an adolescence of idealistic love, to a marriage towards which she goes with a resigned heart but of which she ultimately makes a fine hand."  
Delia Falconer in The Monthly found that "Like its predecessors, Sarah Thornhill will be welcomed by many readers as just the story we need now; others may prefer a less comforting, more ambiguous version of the past."

Awards and nominations

 2013 longlisted International Awards — International IMPAC Dublin Literary Award 
 2012 shortlisted Queensland Literary Awards — Fiction Book Award 
 2012 longlisted Miles Franklin Literary Award 
 2012 shortlisted Prime Minister's Literary Awards — Fiction 
 2012 winner Australian Book Industry Awards (ABIA) — Australian General Fiction Book of the Year 
 2012 shortlisted New South Wales Premier's Literary Awards — Christina Stead Prize for Fiction

References

2011 Australian novels
Text Publishing books